Tony Holden is a television producer and director.  He has been involved in New Zealand television since the 1970s. In the 1970s, he directed episodes of the sketch show A Week of It. In the 1980s, he produced and directed The Billy T. James Show (the 1984 season) and episodes of the Roger Hall sitcom Gliding on. He has produced soap opera Shortland Street, and served as executive producer on numerous specials.

References

External links 
 

New Zealand television directors
Living people
Year of birth missing (living people)